John Atkinson may refer to:

Entertainment
 John Christopher Atkinson (1814–1900), English author, antiquary, and priest
 John Augustus Atkinson (died 1830), English artist engraver and watercolourist
 John Atkinson (actor), Australian actor
 John Atkinson, editor-in-chief of Stereophile Magazine

Sports
 John Atkinson (cricketer) (1878–1951), English cricketer
 John Atkinson (footballer, born 1884) (1884–1914), Scottish footballer
 John Atkinson (Australian footballer) (born 1948), Australian rules footballer
 John Atkinson (rugby league) (1946–2017), English rugby league footballer
 John Atkinson (athlete) (born 1963), Australian high jumper

Other
 John Atkinson (clergyman) (1835–1897), American Methodist clergyman and historian
 John Atkinson, Baron Atkinson (1844–1932), Irish lawyer and politician
 Torchy Atkinson (John Dunstan Atkinson, 1909–1990), New Zealand horticultural scientist
 John William Atkinson (1923–2003), American psychologist
 John Atkinson (Australian politician) (died 1943), Australian politician
 John M. P. Atkinson (1817–1883), president of Hampden–Sydney College
 John Atkinson (professor) (born 1938), professor of Classics

See also
John Atkinson Grimshaw (1836–1893), British painter usually known as Atkinson Grimshaw